The Nikon 1 V2 is a Nikon 1 series high-speed mirrorless interchangeable-lens camera  launched by Nikon on October 24, 2012.

Featuring a new 14 megapixel image sensor and further increased autofocus (hybrid autofocus with phase detection/contrast-detect AF and AF-assist illuminator) speed to 15 frames per second (fps), the maximum continuous shooting speed stays at 60 fps for up to 40 frames.

The image processor Expeed 3A, a successor to the Expeed 3 used in the former Nikon 1 series cameras, features a new (according to Nikon) image-processing engine with increased speed of up to 850 megapixels per second. It is developed exclusively for Nikon 1 cameras.

The Nikon 1 V2 succeeds the Nikon 1 V1 and is succeeded by the Nikon 1 V3. The Nikon 1 V3 improves on the previous model with an 18.4MP sensor, built-in Wifi, FullHD video at 60 frames per second (non-interpolated), up to 120 frames per second video at 720p resolution, 20fps continuous AF, and 171 focus points, which Nikon claims gives better tracking autofocus than even DSLR cameras.

Features
With the launch of the new camera, comes a number of improvements in features from the Nikon 1 V1. The improved sensor and processor have taken the pixels up to 14 megapixels, compared to the previous 10.1 megapixels with V1. Other improvements include a low light boost, faster action capture and improved lens selection.

See also
 Nikon 1 series
 Nikon 1-mount

References

External links

 Nikon 1 V2 Manual Nikon

Nikon MILC cameras
V2
Cameras introduced in 2012